The naval Battle of Öland took place on 26 July 1789 during the Russo-Swedish War (1788–90).

Background
The Swedish battlefleet had spent the winter at Karlskrona which was struck by relapsing fever epidemic during the stay. Epidemic had started from the capture of the Russian ships of line Vladislav during the Battle of Hogland in 1788. From the captured sailors the disease had spread widely into the fleet during its prolonged stay at Sveaborg in 1788 was carried with the fleet to Karlskrona later that year. Fitting ships for the sealing season proceeded very slowly and was greatly hindered by the losses suffered due to the illness to the crews. From December 1788 to September 1789 total of 26,249 were treated for sickness in naval hospitals at Karlskrona alone of whom 5,286 perished while the total death toll of the epidemics is assumed to be around 15,000 lives. By the end of June thousands of soldiers had to be sent from the infantry as reinforcements for the fleet. Regardless of the obstacles Admiral Otto Henrik Nordenskiöld who was responsible for refitting was able to ready fleet of 21 ships of the line and 8 frigates for sailing already for 6 June however without crews.

The Russian fleet had spent the winter of 1788–1789 in split into several elements at Copenhagen, Reval and Kronstadt. Together with newly built ships and effective repairs of ships damaged earlier the Russians were looking to be able to deploy around 40 ships capable to taking part to battle line with combined crew of roughly 30 000 men. Admiral Samuel Grieg who had commanded the Russian fleet at the Battle of Hogland had perished in the autumn 1788 and Admiral Von Dessin who had commanded the elements of the Russian fleet deployed to Copenhagen was removed from command. They were replaced respectively with Admirals Vasili Chichagov and Timofei Kozljaninov. The goal for the Russian naval operations in 1789 was to link together the separated fleet elements and then engage the Swedish fleet as soon as possible while meanwhile providing forces to uphold the blockades of the shipping routes along the Finnish coast.

Lack of crews prevented the Swedish fleet from any training or exercises and it was effectively confined to the docks. The fleet was finally able to set sail on 6 July despite that several ships were still undermanned, several lacking more than hundred men from their complements. Having assembled 21 ships of the line and 8 large frigates under his flag, Prince Karl, Duke of Södermanland decided to intercept the Russian fleet near the island of Öland before the elements of the Russian fleet would be able to link up. Admiral Otto Henrik Nordenskjöld acted as flag-captain to the Duke Charles.

Battle
After setting sail the Swedish fleet patrolled the waters between Skåne, Rügen, Bornholm and Sjælland in the southern Baltic Sea. Fleet was still not clean from diseases (mainly the relapsing fever) and several small dispatch vessels were used for shipping healthy men to fleet while transporting ever growing number of sick back to Karlskrona. On 23 July did the Swedish fleet receive news that 35 ship strong Russian fleet had been seen outside of Gotland and finally at noon on 25 July were the first Russian ships sighted. Both fleets took northernly heading and Swedish tried to close in the distance.

The Russian fleet attempted to slip between the Swedes and Karlskrona but when it became clear that it would not succeed the Russians were content with just keeping distance to the Swedes. Winds were getting stronger which prevented either side from taking action later on 25 July 1789. On morning of 26 July fleets again sighted each other and Swedes again attempted to close in and engage the Russian but were unable to do so as the Russian fleet carefully avoided it. Further problem for the Swedes was that the rear-guard commanded by Admiral Per Lilliehorn had become separated from the rest of the fleet and did not rejoin it despite of repeatedly being ordered to do so.

The Russian fleet continued evading the Swedish trying to slip between the Swedes and their home port. Finally by 1400 on 26 July had first ships reached the cannon range and started the battle. Varying winds forced battle to be paused between 1600 and 1800 but it was later commenced again. Fighting continued until 2000 when the Russian fleet turned towards east. Swedish fleet was unable to follow as the undermanned crews could not handle both guns and sails simultaneously. During the battle the fleets remained fair distance apart and the cannons were fired near their maximum ranges and thus had very little effect. Misfiring cannons and barrel explosions were the main cause of losses on both sides. During the fight three trailing ships of the Russian fleet were left separated from the rest of the fleet. Several Swedish ships were ordered to engage these stragglers but the Swedish ships turned away before even reaching the cannon range. Captains of the ships later claimed that they turned away from the Russian ships according to orders from Admiral Per Liljehorn who kept his ships away from the fight.

Swedes were able to receive reinforcements and ship out the sick on 28 July after which the Swedish turned again to chase the Russians but without success as the Russians repeatedly avoided engaging the Swedish fleet. Similar action was repeated on following days until on 30 July the continuously worsening sickness amongst the crews forced the Swedes to seriously consider returning to their base as roughly 2 500 men had gotten sick after the fleet had set sail. On 31 July the wind turned which was seen as favorable for arrival of the Russian squadron from Copenhagen. To avoid being caught between two Russian fleets the Swedish fleet started back towards Karlskrona. On the same day the Russian squadron from Copenhagen joined with the Russian fleet.

Aftermath
For three days the fleets maneuvered within sight of each other, but finally the Swedes retreated to the naval base at Karlskrona. The battle ended in a draw, but the Russians remained in control of the Baltic Sea. The epidemic that still had not ended at Karlskrona then confined the Swedish fleet to its anchorage for most of the remainder of the year. 

Per Liljehorn was stripped of his admiral's rank even before the fleet returned to Karlskrona. Suspicions concerning Liljehorn arose after the debacle; it was widely suspected that the Russians had bribed him. A court martial convicted him but the government declined to execute him. Chichagov too was investigated for his inaction and avoidance of battle. However, the court martial found him not found guilty because his orders explicitly stated that he should first rendezvous with the Russian squadron from Copenhagen before engaging the Swedish fleet.

The rival fleets

Sweden
Wladislaff 76
Enigheten 74
Götha Lejon 74
Kung Adolf Fredrik 74
Kung Gustaf III 74
Louise Ulrika 74
Sophia Magdalena 74
Fäderneslandet 66
Äran 64
Dristigheten 64
Dygden 64
Försightigheten 64
Hedvig Elisabeth Charlotta 64
Manligheten 64
Ömheten 64
Prins Carl 64
Prins Fredrik Adolf 64
Tapperheten 64
Rättvisan 62
Wasa 62
Riksens Ständer 60
Gripen 44
Uppland 44
Euredice 40
Fröya 40
Galathea 40
Minerva 40
Thetis 40
Zemire 40

Russia
Rostislav 100
Dvyenadtsat Apostolov 100
Knyaz Vladimir 100
Iezekiil 78
Kir Ioann 74
Mstislav 74
Pobyedoslav 74
Prints Gustav 74
Sv. Elena 74
Sv. Petr 74
Yaroslav 74
Boleslav 66
Deris 66
Izyaslav 66
Pamyat Evstafia 66
Rodislav 66
Svyatoslav 66
Viktor 66
Vysheslav 66

References

Bibliography
 R. C. Anderson Naval Wars in the Baltic, 1522–1850.
 

 Magnus Ullman: Från Hogland till Svensksund [From Hogland to Svensksund]

Öland
Conflicts in 1789
Oland (1789)
1789 in Europe